Bayswater may refer to:

Places

Australia 
Bayswater, Victoria, a suburb of Melbourne
Bayswater railway station, Melbourne
Electoral district of Bayswater, an electoral district in Victoria
Bayswater Power Station, New South Wales
City of Bayswater, a local government area near Perth
Bayswater, Western Australia a suburb of Perth
Bayswater railway station, Perth

Canada 
Bayswater, Nova Scotia, on the Aspotogan Peninsula

United Kingdom 
Bayswater, an area of west London
Bayswater Road, a road in London
Bayswater tube station, a London underground station

New Zealand 
Bayswater, New Zealand, a suburb of North Shore City

South Africa 
Bayswater, a suburb of Bloemfontein

United States 
Bayswater, Queens, a neighborhood of New York City